Normanville may refer to:

Places
Normanville, Eure, in the Eure département, Normandy, France
Normanville, Seine-Maritime, in the Seine-Maritime département, Normandy, France
Normanville, a hamlet of Le Mesnil-Lieubray in the Seine-Maritime département, France
Normanville, South Australia, a  town and locality in Australia

People
 Edgar de Normanville (1882-1968) British inventor, engineer and technical journalist
 Eustace de Normanville, an English medieval university chancellor